Ondina mosti is a species of sea snail, a marine gastropod mollusk in the family Pyramidellidae, the pyrams and their allies.

This species was named for B. van der Most, member of the former Malacological Working-group, the Hague.

Description
The shell reaches a length of 2 mm to 2.4 mm.

Distribution
This species occurs in the following locations at depths between 200 m and 400 m.:
 Cape Verde Islands
 Madeira

References

External links
 To CLEMAM
 To Encyclopedia of Life

Pyramidellidae
Gastropods described in 1998
Molluscs of the Atlantic Ocean
Gastropods of Cape Verde
Molluscs of Madeira